William Turner (April 8, 1871 – July 10, 1936) was an Irish-born prelate of the Roman Catholic Church who served as bishop of the Diocese of Buffalo in New York from 1919 until his death in 1936. 

He was ordained in 1893, and spent his early years as a priest teaching in various institutions. Upon his appointment as Bishop of Buffalo he was occupied with pastoral duties in a very large diocese.

Biography

Early life 
William Turner was born at Kilmallock, Ireland. He received his education at Mungret College in Limerick, the Royal University of Ireland, the Propaganda College in Rome, and the Institut Catholique de Paris. 

Turner was ordained to the priesthood on August 13, 1893. That same year, Turner was awarded the Benemerenti medal for a commentary on St. Thomas's De Anima.

The following year he began his career as a professor of Latin and logic at the College of St. Thomas in St. Paul, Minnesota, moving to St. Paul's Seminary in 1895. He was rector of St. Luke's Parish in St. Paul. He later became a librarian and professor of philosophy at the Catholic University of America.

Bishop of Buffalo 
On March 10, 1919, Turner was appointed the sixth bishop of the Diocese of Buffalo by Pope Benedict XV. He received his episcopal consecration on March 30, 1919, from Cardinal James Gibbons, with Bishops Denis J. O'Connell and Michael Curley serving as co-consecrators. 

In July 1919 he was down in Cattaraugus County administering confirmation at St. Patrick's in Salamanca and the next day consecrated the Church of St. Mary of the Angels in Olean, New York. (On February 14, 2017, Pope Francis granted the title of Minor Basilica to St. Mary of the Angels Church in Olean) In August 1922,  Turner helped lay the cornerstone of the Basilica of Our Lady of Victory in Lackawanna, New York. In May 1926, Turner gave an address and blessed the "Millet Cross", erected by the New York State Knights of Columbus dedicated "not only to Father Millet, but to those other priests whose heroism took Christianity into the wilderness and whose devotion sought to create in this new world a new France." The cross stands on the shore of Lake Ontario just west of the Fort Denonville's north redoubt.

Turner's younger brother John, also from County Limerick, was ordained in Rome and came to the United States in 1904. He served as pastor of the Church of St. John the evangelist in White Plains, New York. Rev. Dr. John F. Turner died at his brother's house in Buffalo in 1930 at the age of 51. Later that year, William Turner celebrated the feast of the recently canonized North American Martyrs with a solemn pontifical high Mass at the Church of Saint Vincent de Paul in Buffalo. Four days later he laid the cornerstone for the Lyceum at St. John Kanty Parish in East Buffalo, where “...at least 90% of the people were Catholics, but only about a third practiced their religion.”

Turner was a supporter of the Society of Saint Vincent de Paul, and in 1924 began Catholic Charities in Buffalo in 1924. He established more than 30 new parishes during his administration, including national churches such as Our Lady of Czestochowa Church in North Tonawanda. 

William Turner died in Buffalo on July 10, 1956, at age 65 and was buried at Mount Olivet Cemetery in Tonawanda, New York. A Celtic cross marks his grave.The former Bishop Turner High School in Buffalo was named after him. Built in 1960, the school closed in 2003.

Works
Turner was a contributor to the Catholic Encyclopedia, the American Catholic Quarterly Review, Catholic World, American Ecclesiastical Review, America, the Philosophical Review, Journal of Philosophy, and the Irish Theological Quarterly; and was editor of the Catholic University Bulletin.

 History of Philosophy, 1903
 Storia della filosofia (translated) 1904
 Lessons in Logic, 1911

References

External links
 William Turner, History of Philosophy (Boston: Ginn, 1903)
 

1871 births
1936 deaths
Clergy from County Limerick
19th-century Irish clergy
Irish emigrants to the United States (before 1923)
Catholic University of America faculty
Alumni of the Royal University of Ireland
Roman Catholic bishops of Buffalo
Contributors to the Catholic Encyclopedia
Recipients of the Benemerenti medal